The Centre for Arts, Media, and Technology at St. Patrick Catholic Secondary School (also referred as SPCSS, St. Pats, St. Patrick, St. Patrick C.S.S. or Pats) is a Roman Catholic high school located in Toronto, Ontario, Canada as part of the Toronto Catholic District School Board. It is dedicated to Saint Patrick of Ireland and St. Marguerite Bourgeoys, the founder of the Congregation of Notre Dame. One of Toronto's oldest schools, St. Patrick's used to be an elementary school founded in 1852 until 1983 and turned into a secondary school which opened in 1986 on D'Arcy Street (now the Toronto District School Board's  Heydon Park Secondary School). Since September 1989, St. Patrick had been moved from downtown Toronto into the former Lakeview Secondary School (also owned by the TDSB) in Toronto's east end. The motto for St. Patrick is "Amor Christi nos impellit" which translates to English as "The Love of Christ Impels Us".

History

Patron saint

Saint Patrick was a Romano-British Christian missionary and bishop in Ireland. Known as the "Apostle of Ireland", he is the primary patron saint of the island along with Saints Brigid and Columba.

Two authentic letters from him survive, from which come the only generally accepted details of his life. When he was about 16, he was captured from his home and taken as a slave to Ireland, where he lived for six years before escaping and returning to his family. After becoming a cleric, he returned to northern and western Ireland as an ordained bishop, but little is known about the places where he worked. By the seventh century, he had already come to be revered as the patron saint of Ireland.

Saint Patrick's Day is observed on March 17, the date of his death. It is celebrated both inside and outside Ireland, as both a religious and, especially outside Ireland, secular holiday. In the dioceses of Ireland, it is both a solemnity and a holy day of obligation; outside Ireland, it can be a celebration of Ireland itself. For most of Christianity's first thousand years, canonizations were done on the diocesan or regional level. Relatively soon after the death of people considered very holy, the local Church affirmed that they could be liturgically celebrated as saints. As a result, St. Patrick has never been formally canonised by a Pope; nevertheless, various Christian churches declare that he is a Saint in Heaven (he is in the List of Saints). He is still widely venerated in Ireland and elsewhere today.

The school today

One of Toronto's oldest Catholic schools, St. Patrick was founded as an elementary school on St. Patrick Market St. in downtown Toronto in 1852 during the introduction of publicly funded education in Canada.  At first a primarily Irish school, St. Patrick (patron of Ireland) and St. Marguerite Bourgeoys (a French Canadian) were chosen as the patrons. The school location changed places to Dummer St. to Caerhowel St. to 174 Beverly a 3-story school dubbed during a period as an open air school due to the large balcony facing Beverly which was used to for exposure to the sun for the health of specific students. In 1967 a new school building was started to the south of the old building at 70 D'Arcy St. completed by the September 1968 school season, replacing a former Jewish Orthodox school that was torn down. The old building was used by a private catholic school as a temporary building while waiting for theirs to be built. The elementary school closed in 1983 and was re-opened as a secondary school in 1986 under the leadership of the first principal Sr. Lucille Corrigan, a former principal at Notre Dame High School.

With the extension of public funding of Catholic education to secondary schools, St. Patrick became a secondary school and the Metropolitan Separate School Board (now the Toronto Catholic District School Board) began to search for a new site. The school opened as a result of students cannot be accommodated at Brother Edmund Rice, De La Salle, St. Mary's and St. Joseph College due to lack of space for portable classrooms. Initially, it served the population bordered between south central Toronto, an area south of Dupont Street, west of the Don Valley Parkway and east of Ossington Avenue.

In 1989, during a period of reorganization by the Toronto Board of Education, Lakeview Secondary School, in a new building on the site of a former quarry at 49 Felstead Avenue in Toronto's east end, was closed due to low enrollment and the property was turned over to the MSSB (Metropolitan Separate School Board, now known as TCDSB) to be the new site for St. Patrick. The school has a large feeder area, serving Catholics from almost all of the former City of Toronto's east end.

Overview
The school has seen drastic changes in enrollment over the years as schools in Toronto have suffered from the movement of many families to the suburbs. During the 1990s, after a long period of immigration to Toronto of many Catholic families, St. Patrick's had up to 1,500 students housed in the leased five storey school building. The student population began to dwindle in the 2000s and stood at only 549 students in 2012–13 followed by 617 in 2013–14. Students chose to go to other schools in the area such as Neil McNeil, Notre Dame, Danforth, and Malvern. The population of the school began to increase steadily in 2014, and by 2016, an additional 200 students are going to be enrolled to St. Patrick. As of 2017–18 school year, only 767 students are enrolled. In 2014, Fraser Institute released its annual report card on Ontario's Secondary Schools; St.Patrick's Catholic Secondary School was mentioned as one of the fastest improving schools in Toronto. Scoring from 2.9 (2009–2010) to 6.4 (2013–2014) out of 10. The ethnic make-up of the student population has also changed; today it is very diverse with a large number of Black, Hispanic, Chinese, White, and Filipino students.

Centre for the Arts, Media, and Technology
In June 2010, St. Patrick was chosen to be a grade 9-12 Arts, Media and Technologies Centre by TCDSB and designated in February 2011 in an attempt to put the limits on enrollment sitting fewer than 500-600 students with the school below capacity, while nearby schools such as Neil McNeil and Notre Dame are overcrowded. This program has since started in September 2011. The Arts focus on Dance, Drama, Music (vocal, band & guitar), & Visual Arts would require admission to the program is by audition (guitar, vocal, instrumental music) and workshop (dance, drama and visual arts). Technology & Media Studies programs do not require any additional applications.

Academics
A full range of academic programming is offered to students. The aim is for students to achieve success by meeting individual learning needs and providing more opportunities to experience and build strengths and interests through a variety of enhanced learning opportunities.  These skills enable each student to move forward to post-secondary goals of university, college, apprenticeship or the world of work. St. Patrick has undergone extensive renovations with the purchase of new up-to-date facilities for theatre and visual arts, physical education and construction technology.

Campus features
Swimming pool 
Outdoor tennis/basketball court
Outdoor FIFA-grade turf field 
Full size track and field
Two music rooms
Two double gymnasiums that can be divided
Mini Restaurant called The Shamrock served by students in the hospitality and tourism course
Three computer labs
Two Mac labs 
Full sized 500-seated auditorium, with newly updated lights & stage floor.
Windowed cafeteria with full view of school sports field & panorama of the city
A newly built chapel for both staff and students
Wood shop
Dance studio
Weight room
Daycare attached

Feeder schools
 Earl Grey Sr. P.S.
 Holy Name (690 Carlaw Ave.)
 Our Lady of Lourdes (444 Sherbourne St.)
 St. Ann (Riverdale)
 St. Brigid (300 Wolverleigh Blvd.)
 St. Dunstan (14 Pharmacy Ave.)
 St. Joseph (176 Leslie St.)
 St. Michael (50 George St. South)
 St. Paul (80 Sackville St.)
 St. William (343 Jones Ave.)
East York
 Canadian Martyrs (520 Plains Rd.)
 Cosburn M.S.
 D.A. Morrison M.S.
 Gordon A. Brown M.S.
 Holy Cross (299A Donlands Ave.)
 St. John XXIII (Flemingdon Park)
 St. Aloysius (Glebeholme)
 Westwood M.S. (Carlaw Ave.)

See also
List of high schools in Ontario

References

External links
The Centre for Arts, Media, and Technology @ St. Patrick Catholic Secondary School

Toronto Catholic District School Board
Educational institutions established in 1986
High schools in Toronto
Catholic secondary schools in Ontario
Bill 30 schools
1986 establishments in Ontario
Art schools in Canada